Phragmolites is an extinct genus of molluscs in the family Bucaniidae, paleozoic molluscs of uncertain position possibly being either Gastropods or Monoplacophorans in the superfamily Bellerophontoidea.

P. elegans Miller 1874 (syn. Conradella elegans, Cyrtolites elegans) is from the Ordovician of Ohio.

Species 
Phragmolites bellulus, Phragmolites cellulosus, Phragmolites compressus (type), Phragmolites desideratus, Phragmolites dyeri, Phragmolites elegans, Phragmolites excavatus, Phragmolites fimbriata, Phragmolites girvanensis, Phragmolites huoliensis, Phragmolites hyperboreus, Phragmolites imbricata, Phragmolites lindstroemi, Phragmolites multinotatus, Phragmolites obliquus, Phragmolites pannosus, Phragmolites phaecus, Phragmolites sladensis, Phragmolites slawsoni, Phragmolites suarezi, Phragmolites triangularis

See also 
 List of marine gastropod genera in the fossil record

References

External links 
 
 

Bucaniidae
Prehistoric mollusc genera
Paleozoic life of Ontario
Paleozoic life of the Northwest Territories
Paleozoic life of Quebec